Sport Dos e Mayo is a Peruvian association football club, playing in the city of Tarma.

The club were founded 23 February 1919 and play in the Copa Perú which is the third division of the Peruvian league.

History
In the 2002 Copa Perú, the club classified to the Regional Stage, but was eliminated by León de Huánuco.

In the 2010 Copa Perú, the club classified to the Regional Stage, but was eliminated by Bella Durmiente.

Rivalries
Sport Dos de Mayo has had a long-standing rivalry with Asociación Deportiva Tarma.

Honours

Regional
Región V: 1
Winners (1): 2002

Liga Departamental de Junín: 2
Winners (2): 2002, 2010

Liga Provincial de Tarma: 2
Winners (4): 2002, 2010, 2016, 2018
Runner-up (2): 2013, 2015

Liga Distrital de Tarma: 1
Winners (1): 2010
Runner-up (4): 2013, 2015, 2016, 2018

See also
List of football clubs in Peru
Peruvian football league system

References

Football clubs in Peru